Dugald McBrayne MacIsaac (25 Jule 1901 – 20 February 1961) was a Scottish chess player.

Biography
Dugald MacIsaac moved to Glasgow from his native Ardrishaig before World War I. He was active in correspondence chess circles in the 1920s. Dugald MacIsaac joined the Central Chess Club (Glasgow) and won the club championship on a number of occasions. In 1938, he won his tenth championship of the club. Dugald MacIsaac was a leading member of the club's Richardson Cup team, winning the trophy in 1925 and 1929. He was also a member of Glasgow Chess Club and won the club championship in 1924. Dugald MacIsaac also won the West of Scotland Championship in 1927, 1928 and 1938. He was chess correspondent for The Herald (Glasgow) from 1930 to 1959.

Dugald MacIsaac played for Scotland in the Chess Olympiad:
 In 1933, at third board in the 5th Chess Olympiad in Folkestone (+0, =2, -9).

References

External links

Dugald MacIsaac chess games at 365chess.com

1901 births
1961 deaths
Sportspeople from Argyll and Bute
Scottish chess players
Chess Olympiad competitors
20th-century chess players